Partho Mitra is an Indian director known for work in Hindi film, television and digital industry. His works as director includes popular Indian soap operas like Bade Acche Lagte Hain, Kasamh Se and Itna Karo Na Mujhe Pyaar. He has also directed Bollywood film Koi Aap Sa and web series Hum - I'm Because of Us.

Filmography

Films

Television

Web series

References

External links
 

Living people
Hindi-language film directors
Indian television directors
21st-century Indian film directors
Year of birth missing (living people)